Adama Traoré may refer to:

 Adama Traoré (footballer, born 1989), Malian footballer
 Adama Traoré (footballer, born 1990), Ivorian footballer most notable for playing with Basel in Switzerland and Melbourne Victory in Australia.
 Adama Traoré (footballer, born 5 June 1995), Malian footballer who plays for Ferencváros in Hungary
 Adama Traoré (footballer, born 28 June 1995), Malian footballer who plays in England for Hull City
 Adama Traoré (footballer, born 1996), Spanish footballer who plays in England for Wolverhampton Wanderers
 Adama Traoré (footballer, born 2000), Ivorian footballer who plays in Belgium for Waasland-Beveren
 Adama Traoré (died in police custody) (1992–2016), a Malian French man who died in French police custody in 2016